Banteay Meanchey is a province of Cambodia located in the far northwest. It borders the provinces of Oddar Meanchey to the north, Siem Reap to the east, Battambang to the south, and shares an international border with Thailand to the west.  Its capital and largest city is Serei Saophoan.

Banteay Meanchey is the 13th largest province in Cambodia. With a population of 861,883, it ranks as the ninth most populous in the nation. The city of Poipet in the western part of the province is an international border crossing into Thailand. Banteay Meanchey is one of the nine provinces that are part of the Tonlé Sap Biosphere Reserve.

Etymology

Banteay Meanchey means "Victorious Fortress" in Khmer. The word chey is derived from the Sanskrit word jaya meaning "victory" with mean means ''to have'', so the combination of both literally means ''to have victory'' and banteay is a Khmer word meaning "fortress" or "castle".

History

The area was part of the extensive Khmer Empire. Its most notable remains is the Banteay Chhmar temple in the north of the province, built in 12th century towards the 13th century. Other lesser known temples are the Banteay Neang and Banteay Torp temples.

In the 1795 Siam took control over Western Cambodia, and made the area into Siamese province of Inner Cambodia with the administration capital in Phra Tabong (Battambang). This province lasted until 1907 when Siam traded Inner Cambodia for the return of Trat and Dan Sai. In the same year, King Sisowath decided to split the return Inner Cambodian province into Battambang province (which included Sisophon) and Siem Reap province. When Thailand re annexed western Cambodia 1941, Sisophon was split off Battambang province and was an administration capital of Phibunsongkram province which lasted until 1946 when the whole region was return to the French control.

In 1988 the province Banteay Meanchey was split off from Battambang, originally consisting of the five districts Mongkol Borei, Thmar Puok, Serei Saophoan, Preah Net Preah and Phnom Srok.

During the Cambodian Civil Wars of the 1970s and 1980s Banteay Meanchey province was on the frontlines of much of fighting and as a result it is one of the three most heavily mined provinces in Cambodia along with Pailin and Battambang.

Geography

Banteay Meanchey is mostly covered by extensive lowlands, with a few uplands to the north and east. The main rivers are the Mongkol Borei and the Sisophon Rivers. The province is bordered with Battambang to the south, Siem Reap to the East, Odar Meanchey to the North and Thailand to the West and North.

Economy

Poipet International Border Checkpoint 

Banteay Meanchey has one of Cambodia's busiest checkpoints, Poipet International Border Checkpoint, for both people and goods. The checkpoint oversees approximately 2,000 tourists (50,000 tourists or 14% of nation's tourists annually in 2015) and 300 trucks carrying goods every day. In response to the increase of trade between Cambodia and Thailand, a new border checkpoint, Stueng Bot which is only 7 km from Poipet Checkpoint, is being constructed and slated to be completed by 2018. The new checkpoint will focus on trade while leaving  Poipet Checkpoint for tourists.

Special Economic Zone (SEZ) and Industry  
O'Neang Special Economic Zone was officially approved in 2006. In 2014, the zone hosted 5 factories includings CAMPAC Co. Ltd, a Thai company which produces package for jewellery, Hi-Tech Apparel (Cambodia) Co., Ltd., ML Intermate Apparel (Cambodia) Co., Ltd., SIMMER Inter Co., Ltd., and Wireform Precision Parts Co., Ltd. O'Neang employed 1,200 workers. In recent years, Japanese and Cambodian investors jointly established a new Special Economic Zone, Sanco. The 66.5 hectare zone has already attracted NHK Spring, a Japanese car-seat manufacturer and Toyota supplier. In March 2015, Toyota Tsusho Corporation (Toyota Tsusho) announced that it will establish Techno Park Poipet Pvt. Co., Ltd. to optimize its regional supply chains. The park will provide subcontracted auto part service and plans to service 10 or more companies by 2020. Thanks to its cheap labour cost, cheaper and stable electricity supply from Thailand ( $0.16 per kilowatt), its proximity to Bangkok and favorable investment policy, Poipet is seen as a future industrial city of the Northwestern part of Cambodia.

Transportation 
Banteay Meanchey sits on a strategic cross point that directs to Thailand, Siem Reap (Angkor Wat) and Battambang (gateway to Phnom Penh and Vietnam). As of 2018, infrastructure such as national roads, provincial roads and railway have been improved significantly. The historical re-operation of Royal Railway that links Thailand to Phnom Penh and Cambodia's seaport city started in April 2018. In this first phase, people can travel by train from Poi Pet to Sereisophorn and Battambang. Links from Battambang to Pursat, Kampong Chhnang and Phnom Penh will soon be completed. The national road number 5 is being upgraded to meet international standard. The project is funded by Japanese government in a broader plan to connect Thailand, Cambodia, and Vietnam.

Agriculture 
Agriculture, particularly rice paddy, plays very important role in the province's economy.

Administration 
The province is subdivided into 7 districts (srok) and 2 municipalities (krong), which are further subdivided into 55 communes (khum) and 10 quarters (sangkat), and 654 villages (phum).

Attractions

Banteay Chhmar 
Prasat Banteay Chhmar is one of the masterpieces of the great king Jayavarman VII built between the 12th-13th century. Despite its magnificent architecture, the temples are lesser known to tourists and the world. Unlike other Angkorean temples, Banteay Chhmar is not well-conserved. The damages caused by war, looters and nature are very apparent. The temple is being on Cambodia's tentative list for UNESCO's world heritage in order to increase conservation and awareness.

Notable people 
Khim Bora, Cambodian boxer
Khim Dima, Cambodian boxer
Sok Thy, Cambodian boxer

References

External links
Banteay Meanchey at Royal Government of Cambodia website
Banteay Meanchey at Ministry of Commerce website

 
Provinces of Cambodia